George Goddard (1903 – 1987) was a professional footballer who played as a centre forward in the 1920s and 1930s, notably with Queens Park Rangers F.C., he scored 174 Football League goals (186 including cup goals) in 243 appearances for Queens Park Rangers, becoming the club's leading goalscorer. At Queens Park Rangers, Goddard netted an impressive 37 league goals in 41 league appearances during the 1929-30 campaign. Including 2 FA Cup goals he scored a total of 39 goals in only 45 games.

Goddard left Queens Park Rangers, in December 1933, being sold to Brentford, due to Queens Park Rangers poor financial state and needing to raise money, due to their ill fated spell at the White City Stadium.

Goddard also had spells at Wolves, Sunderland and Southend United in the later stages of his career.

References

English Football League players
Queens Park Rangers F.C. players
Redhill F.C. players
Brentford F.C. players
Sunderland A.F.C. players
Southend United F.C. players
Wolverhampton Wanderers F.C. players
People from Gomshall
1903 births
1987 deaths
Association football forwards
English footballers